The 1993–94 Elitserien was the 60th season of the top division of Swedish handball. 12 teams competed in the league. The league was split into an autumn league and a spring league. The eight highest placed teams in the autumn league qualified for the spring league. HK Drott won the regular season and also won the playoffs to claim their 8th Swedish title.

League tables

Autumn

Spring

Playoffs

Quarterfinals
 Redbergslids IK–IF Saab 25–23
 IF Saab–Redbergslids IK 24–21
 Redbergslids IK–IF Saab 21–16
Redbergslids IK won series 2–1

 Lugi HF–IFK Skövde 25–16
 IFK Skövde–Lugi HF 24–23
 Lugi HF–IFK Skövde 23–18
Lugi HF won series 2–1

Semifinals 
 HK Drott–Lugi HF 24–14
 Lugi HF–HK Drott 12–30
HK Drott won series 2–0

 IK Sävehof–Redbergslids IK 23–21
 Redbergslids IK–IK Sävehof 21–17
 IK Sävehof–Redbergslids IK 15–14
IK Sävehof won series 2–1

Finals 
 HK Drott–IK Sävehof 18–17
 IK Sävehof–HK Drott 17–22
 HK Drott–IK Sävehof 23–16
HK Drott won series 3–0

References 

Swedish handball competitions